Osvaldo de León (born May 6, 1984 in Brownsville, Texas, United States) is an American actor and model. He debuted on television in 2007 in the Mexican telenovela Palabra de Mujer, playing Ariel Castellanos. Osvaldo has participated in several plays and Mexican movies, and since its inception with Televisa has participated in several soap operas such as Juro que te amo, Niña de mi Corazón, Una familia con suerte, Lo que la vida me robó, La Malquerida and Sueño de amor and La candidata

Biography
Born in Brownsville, Texas, United States and grew up in Matamoros, Tamaulipas. He left his hometown to begin his acting studies in Mexico City at the Centro de Educación Artística (CEA). He took several courses at Casa Azul such as 'Hacer el humor' and 'Creación de personaje con imaginación', just to name a few.

Professionally, he has participated in theater in plays such as, O´Neill's  'Ah, Wilderness' (2007), 'Escenas de Amor Shakespeare' (2007), 'Our Town´ by Thorton Wilder' (2006), Shakespeare's 'A Midsummer Night's Dream' (2005) and 'Othello' (2009)  in which he played 'Casio,' a role for which he won the award for Best APT Co-Actor and also ´The Tempest´(2011) beside actors like Ignacio Lopez Tarso. Months later he was for a short time in the staging of 'Sicario', directed by Felipe Fernandez del Paso. Currently working on Arthur Millers "Death of a Salesman" soon to come out in theatre this summer 2012.

In film he was cast in the movie 'La noche de las Flores' (2009), directed by Adrian Burns. In 2012 he will play Tobías in the film Hidden Moon, directed by José Bojorquez.

On television has taken several projects like the telenovelas Juro que te amo (2008) and Palabra de Mujer, among others. He also made a participation in the series Locas de Amor. In 2010, he played the role of Juan Vicente in the telenovela Niña de mi Corazón,  which was produced by Pedro Damián. He currently plays the role of Tomás Campos in the telenovela Una Familia con Suerte.

Personal life
His son Teo, from his previous relationship with Cecilia Suárez, was born in April 2010. Ιn December 2011, he started a relationship with Cassandra Sanchez Navarro, which ended in May 2012.

Filmography

Film

Television roles

Awards And Nominations

References

External links

 Osvaldo de Leon at EsMas

1984 births
Living people
Mexican male telenovela actors
American male telenovela actors
American male actors of Mexican descent
People from Matamoros, Tamaulipas
Male actors from Tamaulipas
People from Brownsville, Texas
Male actors from Texas